The Advanced Diabetes Management Certification (BC-ADM) is a certification offered by the American Association of Diabetes Educators.

Health care professionals seeking the BC-ADM credential must hold a current, active registered nurse (advanced practice registered nurse, clinical nurse specialist), physician, physician assistant, registered dietitian or pharmacist license in a state or territory of the United States, or the professional, legally recognized equivalent in another country. They must also hold a graduate degree in a clinically relevant discipline from an accredited program, pass the certification exam, and have completed 500 clinical hours of advanced diabetes management within the 48 months prior to applying for the exam.

Advanced diabetes practice includes management skills such as medication adjustment, medical nutrition therapy, exercise planning, counseling for behavior management, and psychosocial issues. The depth of knowledge and competence in advanced clinical practice and diabetes skills affords an increased complexity of decision making, which expands the traditional discipline specific practice. Other responsibilities of advanced practice include treatment and monitoring of acute and chronic complications, research, and mentoring.

See also 
American Association of Diabetes Educators

References

External links 

Professional titles and certifications
Nursing credentials and certifications